Douglas West may refer to:

People
Douglas West (mathematician), American mathematician

Other
Douglas West (constituency), constituency of the House of Keys, Isle of Man
Douglas West, a former mining community a mile north-west of Douglas, South Lanarkshire